David Hay (2 October 1815 – 30 December 1883) was a Scottish nurseryman active in New Zealand. He was born in Rhynd, Perthshire, Scotland.

References

1815 births
1883 deaths
New Zealand horticulturists
People from Perthshire
Scottish emigrants to New Zealand
Nurserymen
Scottish horticulturists